Venegas is a Spanish surname. Notable people with the surname include:

Andrés Venegas García (1848–1939), Costa Rican politician
Charlie Venegas (born 1967), American speedway rider
Erika Venegas (born 1988), Mexican footballer
Francisco Venegas (1525-1595), Spanish painter
Francisco Eduardo Venegas (born 1998), Mexican footballer
Francisco Javier Venegas (1754–1838), Spanish military officer and viceroy
Guillermo Venegas Lloveras (1915–1993), Puerto Rican songwriter
Juan Evangelista Venegas (1929–1980s), Puerto Rican boxer
Julieta Venegas (born 1970), Mexican musician and singer
 Karen Paulina Rojo Venegas, alcaldessa of Antofagasta
Kevin Venegas (born 1989), American soccer player
Luis Gerardo Venegas (born 1984), Mexican footballer
Luis Venegas (born 1979), Spanish magazine publisher
Luis Venegas de Henestrosa (c. 1510–1570), Spanish composer
Marco Venegas (born 1962), Swedish politician
Miguel Venegas (1680–1764), Mexican jesuit
Pascual Venegas Filardo (1911–2003), Venezuelan poet, writer and journalist
Rosa Venegas, Peruvian politician
Socorro Venegas (born 1972), Mexican writer

Spanish-language surnames